North Northern Scots refers to the dialects of Scots spoken in Caithness, the Black Isle and Easter Ross.

Caithness

The dialect of Caithness is generally spoken in the lowlying land to the east of a line drawn from Clyth Ness to some 4 miles west of Thurso. To the west of that Scottish Gaelic used to be spoken. The Caithness varieties have been influenced by both Gaelic and Norn. The dialect spoken in the neighbourhood of John o' Groats resembles that of Orkney to some extent.

Phonology

The phonology of the Caithness varieties generally follows the pattern of the Mid Northern Scots varieties but:

Initial j or g, which is realised  in most other Scots dialects, may be realised .
The k in the cluster kn may be pronounced in for example, knife and knowe (knoll).
The initial th dropped in all pronominals, for example the, they (thay) and thare (there) etc.
The w in the cluster wr may be realised  in Canisbay, in for example wrack (wreck) and wrang (wrong).
ai (vowel 8) in initial and medial positions and a(consonant)e (vowel 4), usually , may be realised  in, for example, alane (alone), ane (one), ance (once), bane (bone), hail (whole), hairse (hoarse), hame (home), kail (kale), kaim (comb), stane (stone) and wame (belly).
au (vowel 12) may be realised  rather than  before ld in, for example Bauld (bold), cauld (cold) and sauld (sold).
i(consonant)e, y(consonant)e (vowels 1 and 10 ) may be realised  in, for example, bide (remain), byke (wasps' nest), line and pipe.
Also u(consonant)e, especially before nasals, and  oo from the spelling of Standard English cognates, in for example, abuin (above), cuit (ankle) and guid (good), often written abeen, keet and geed in dialect writing. The realisation is usually  before  in, for example, buird (board), fluir (floor) and fuird (ford), often written boord, floor and foord in dialect writing. The realisation  also occurs in adae (ado), dae (do), shae (shoe) and tae (to~too).

Grammar

The grammar generally follows that of other Scots dialects, but:

The diminutive -ock is realised  influenced by or borrowed from Gaelic. A final -ock in other words may also be realised . Often written -ag in dialect writing.

Black Isle and Easter Ross

Contact with Mid Northern Scots via fishermen from the Moray Firth and modern education has influenced the Black Isle varieties to some extent.  Avoch was originally Gaelic speaking but was settled by Scots-speakers, especially fisher folk, in the 17th century. More recently there has been a shift to Highland English. The traditional Black Isle dialect of Cromarty became extinct in October 2012, upon the death of the last native speaker, Bobby Hogg.

Phonology

The phonology of the Black Isle and Easter Ross varieties generally follow the pattern of the Caithness varieties but:

Initial ch, usually realised  in other Scots dialects, may be realised  in, for example, chap (knock), chield (fellow), chirl (chirp) and chowk (cheek).
Initial h may be 'dropped' in, for example, haund (hand) and hoose (house) but 'added' in for example in ale and Annie.
wh may be dropped or realised  in the pronominals wha (who), whit (what), whase (whose), whan (when) and whaur (where). The realisation may also be  as in Mid Northern Scots and in Cromarty the realisation may be  .

References

External links 
 A phonetic description of North Northern Scots
 A popular look at the Caithness dialect

Scots dialects
Culture in Highland (council area)
Caithness
Ross and Cromarty